The West Wing is an American political drama television series created by Aaron Sorkin and produced by John Wells Productions and Warner Bros. Television. It originally aired on NBC from September 22, 1999, to May 14, 2006, broadcasting 156 episodes over seven seasons. A special episode was also released on October 15, 2020, on HBO Max.

The show follows the lives of White House staffers during the fictional Democratic presidential administration of Josiah Bartlet. The show originally starred Rob Lowe as Sam Seaborn, Moira Kelly as Mandy Hampton, Allison Janney as C. J. Cregg, Richard Schiff as Toby Ziegler, John Spencer as Leo McGarry, Bradley Whitford as Josh Lyman, and Martin Sheen as Bartlet. Over the course of the show's run, the main cast added Dulé Hill as Charlie Young, Janel Moloney as Donna Moss, Stockard Channing as Abbey Bartlet, Joshua Malina as Will Bailey, Mary McCormack as Kate Harper, Jimmy Smits as Matt Santos, Alan Alda as Arnold Vinick, and Kristin Chenoweth as Annabeth Schott.

Overall, the show won 100 awards from 289 nominations, including 27 Primetime Emmy Awards from 98 nominations. It was nominated for the Primetime Emmy Award for Outstanding Drama Series for all seven seasons it aired and won in each of its first four seasons; it is tied for the record for most wins in the category. By the end of its run, it was tied with Hill Street Blues for the most Emmys won by a drama series, a record later surpassed by Game of Thrones. The show also won nine Emmys for its first season, setting a record for most Emmys won by a series in one year that stood until Game of Thrones earned twelve Emmys in 2015. In addition, it won two Golden Globe Awards, three Directors Guild of America Awards, four Producers Guild of America Awards, six Screen Actors Guild Awards, and two Writers Guild of America Awards, among others. The series also received two Peabody Awards in 1999 and 2000.

Many cast members received individual recognition for their performances. Janney received two Emmy awards for Supporting Actress and two for Lead Actress, as well as a Satellite Award and two Screen Actors Guild Awards for her performance. Sheen won a Golden Globe Award, a Satellite Award, and two Screen Actors Guild Awards, while Schiff, Whitford, Spencer, Channing, and Alda each won an Emmy for their supporting roles. As a whole, the cast won two Screen Actors Guild Awards for Outstanding Performance by an Ensemble in a Drama Series and a Satellite Award for Outstanding Television Ensemble.

Awards and nominations

Emmy awards and nominations for the cast

Notes

References

External links
 The West Wing at Emmys.com
 

Awards
West Wing, The